Gonichthys cocco, often called the Cocco's lanternfish, is a species of oceanodromous lanternfish.

Distribution and habitat 
It lives in the Eastern and Western Atlantic, near areas like Portugal, Liberia, Angola, South Africa, Brazil, and the eastern Mediterranean.

Description 
It has 10 to 13 dorsal soft rays, and 21 to 23 anal soft rays. Mature males have 6 to 8 supracaudal luminous structures, while mature females only have 3 to 6.

Conservation 
It has no threats; its distribution overlaps with several marine protected areas, and its population is stable, and is listed as Least Concern by the IUCN Red List.

Taxonomy 
G. cocco is one of four species in its genus. The other three are Gonichthys barnesi, Gonichthys tenuiculus, and Gonichthys venetus.

Synonymised names 
Placed by the WoRMS.

 Alysia loricata Lowe, 1839
 Gonichthys coccoi Cocco, 1829 (misspelling)
 Myctophum coccoi Cocco, 1829  (misspelling)
 Myctophum hians Richardson, 1845
 Rhinoscopelus cocco Cocco, 1829
 Rhinoscopelus coccoi Cocco, 1829 (misspelling)
 Scopelus cocco Cocco, 1829
 Scopelus coccoi Günther, 1864
 Scopelus gracile Lütken, 1892
 Scopelus gracilis Lütken, 1892
 Scopelus jagorii Peters, 1859 (synonym)

References 

Fish described in 1829
Taxa named by Anastasio Cocco
Myctophidae
Fish of the Atlantic Ocean